Our Lady of the Cloud is a Marian devotion of Ecuador and Peru.

History
The depiction of the Virgin Mary. When in 1696 the bishop of Quito Sancho de Andrade y Figueroa was ill on December 30 the people of Guápulo or Quito made a prayer procession to Quito with the image of Our Lady from the church of Guápulo. On their way the Blessed Mother appeared in the sky on a cloud seen by about 500 people. After the event Franciscan friars founded a sanctuary in Azogues, known as the Santuario de la Virgen de la Nube. Now the Fiesta de la Virgen de la Nube takes place annually in Azogues. The veneration was also adopted by nuns in Lima which started its spreading in Peru.

Veneration
Our Lady of the Cloud is venerated in Ecuador, in Peru and by immigrants in the United States.

See also 
 Lord of Miracles

References

External links
 Artículo

Cloud
Marian devotions